Mong Hsu is the principal town of Mong Hsu Township of Shan State.

History
It was the main town of one of the Shan States, Monghsu, known in ancient times as Hansawadi.

In early 1990s, there is a major discovery rubies near Mong Hsu. Within a few years, Mong Hsu rubies constituted over 95% of faceted rubies entering world market; however, they require considerable sophisticated treatment.

References

Populated places in Shan State
Township capitals of Myanmar